Genuchinus is a genus of myermecophilic beetles in the family Scarabaeidae. There are about 10 described species in Genuchinus.

Species
These 10 species belong to the genus Genuchinus:
 Genuchinus digitatus Krikken, 1981
 Genuchinus ineptus (Horn, 1885)
 Genuchinus moroni Martinez, 1992
 Genuchinus muzo Krikken, 1981
 Genuchinus nevermanni Schauer, 1935
 Genuchinus parvulus Krikken, 1981
 Genuchinus peruanus Moser, 1910
 Genuchinus sulcipennis Westwood, 1874
 Genuchinus velutinus Westwood, 1874
 Genuchinus v-notatum Westwood, 1874

References

Further reading

 
 
 

Cetoniinae
Articles created by Qbugbot